Bernard James Rowe (15 May 1904 – 5 March 1986) was an English freestyle sport wrestler who competed for Great Britain in the 1924 Summer Olympics and in the 1928 Summer Olympics.

In 1924 he finished eleventh in the freestyle middleweight tournament. Four years later he finished sixth in the freestyle light heavyweight tournament at the 1928 Olympics. At the 1934 Empire Games, he won the silver medal in the freestyle light heavyweight class.

Family
His brother, Douglas, played football with Luton Town, Lincoln City and Southampton.

References

External links
Bernard Rowe's profile at Sports Reference.com

1904 births
1986 deaths
Sportspeople from Nottingham
Olympic wrestlers of Great Britain
Wrestlers at the 1924 Summer Olympics
Wrestlers at the 1928 Summer Olympics
British male sport wrestlers
Wrestlers at the 1934 British Empire Games
Commonwealth Games silver medallists for England
Commonwealth Games medallists in wrestling
Medallists at the 1934 British Empire Games